Francis Joseph Dunphy (born October 5, 1948) is an American college basketball coach, who is the head coach of the La Salle Explorers of the Atlantic 10 Conference. He is the former men's basketball coach at Temple University and the University of Pennsylvania.  He succeeded John Chaney in 2006 and was succeeded by Aaron McKie in 2019. In June 2020, Dunphy was named interim athletic director of Temple. In 2022, he was named the next men's basketball coach for the La Salle Explorers.

Coaching career
Dunphy's coaching career began at the United States Military Academy (1971–72), where he served as an assistant under head coach Dan Dougherty. In 1977 he became the head basketball coach and accounting teacher of his high school alma mater, Malvern Prep. He remained there until becoming Lefty Ervin's assistant at La Salle University (1979–80). The following year, Dunphy joined Gary Williams’ staff at American University. He returned to La Salle in 1985, serving one more season under Ervin and assisting Speedy Morris for two seasons.  He left La Salle to become head coach Tom Schneider's top assistant at Penn in 1988. Dunphy succeeded Schneider as Penn head coach a year later. In 2006 he succeeded John Chaney as head coach of the Temple Owls.

Penn
In 1989, Dunphy was named the 16th head coach at Penn.  He compiled a 310–163 overall record and won 10 Ivy League titles in his 17-year career. Dunphy's 310 wins are the most by any Penn coach and are second all-time in the Ivy League to Princeton's Pete Carril.  His Quaker teams won 48 straight Ivy League games and four league titles from 1992 through 1996.  His 1993–94 team had a 25–3 record and was ranked 25th in the CNN/USA Today Coaches’ Poll, the program's first such ranking since 1978–79. In 1994, Penn upset sixth-seeded Nebraska 90–80 in the NCAA tournament. Dunphy is considered among the finest coaches in Ivy League history.

Dunphy vs. the Ivy League
 Brown 28–6
 Columbia 28–6
 Cornell 30–4
 Dartmouth 30–4
 Harvard 29–5
 Princeton 20–15
 Yale 26–9

Temple
Dunphy was introduced as the head coach at Temple on April 10, 2006 after legendary Owls coach John Chaney retired the previous month. By taking the job, Dunphy became the first man ever to lead two Big 5 basketball programs.

In 2008, Dunphy coached Temple to the Atlantic 10 tournament championship.  He also won the Herb Good Eastern Coach of the Year Award for the 2007–08 season.  They lost a close game to Michigan State (who advanced to the Sweet Sixteen) in the first round of the 2008 NCAA tournament. The 2009 team placed 2nd in the A10 conference for the second straight season.  The Owls repeated as Atlantic 10 tournament champions 2009; Temple University is the first A10 team to repeat as A10 tournament champions since TU accomplished this task under the reign of John Chaney 2000–01. Dunphy's 2009–10 Temple team won 11 of its first 13 games, including a victory over cross-town rival and then-third ranked Villanova, before falling to top-ranked Kansas. The 2009–10 team also ranked in the top twenty-five for more than eleven straight weeks in both major polls, and won its third consecutive Atlantic 10 tournament title. However, for the third straight season, Dunphy's Owls lost in the first round of NCAA tournament, this time to Ivy League champion Cornell.

Dunphy would finally claim his first NCAA tournament victory at Temple in the 2010–11 season when Temple knocked off inner-state rival Penn St. 66–64 in the second round on a last-second buzzer-beater by sophomore Juan Fernandez. Temple would lose in the following round to 2-seed San Diego State 71–64 in a gut-wrenching double-overtime thriller. Dunphy would lead the Owls back to the tournament in the 2011–12 season, only to be upset in the second round by South Florida 58–44. In the following season after losing senior guards Juan Fernandez and Ramone Moore, Dunphy led the Owls to an early-season upset of then 3-seed Syracuse – a team that eventually made the Final Four – at Madison Square Garden and #21 VCU on the final day of the regular season to secure a 6th straight NCAA tournament appearance. The Owls would knock off 8-seed North Carolina State 76–72 in the second round before losing to 1-seed Indiana 58–52 in a game that Temple led the majority of the way.

After placing 9th and a tie for 3rd in their first two years in the American Athletic Conference, the Temple Owls won the 2015–16 regular season AAC title with a 14–4 conference record. For the second straight year, Dunphy won AAC Coach of the Year honors for exceeding pre-season expectations (before both the 2014–15 and 2–15–16 seasons, Temple was projected to come in 6th in the AAC. They came in a tie for 3rd and 1st respectively).

On April 12, 2018, it was announced that Dunphy would step down as Temple head coach at the end of the 2018–19 season, with assistant coach and former Owl player Aaron McKie succeeding him.

Dunphy was named interim athletic director of Temple University, effective July 1, 2020. He replaced Patrick Kraft, who left to take the position at Boston College. Dunphy was replaced in this position by Arthur Johnson.

La Salle
On April 5, 2022, The Philadelphia Inquirer reported that the La Salle would hire Dunphy to be the Explorers' next men's basketball coach. With his hiring, Dunphy returned to coach at his alma mater and became the first coach to lead three different Big 5 programs. He replaced Ashley Howard in this position.

Mr. Big Five
Dunphy passed John Chaney (516 Big 5 wins) as the all-time winningest coach in Philadelphia Big 5 history. Dunphy, who lived his first 10 years in Southwest Philadelphia before moving to nearby Drexel Hill, Pa., starred at La Salle from 1967 through 1970. He would later serve as an assistant at his alma mater (1979–80; 1985–88) before taking the assistant coaching job at Penn for the 1988–89 season. After one season he would take over as the Quakers head coach, compiling a 310–163 record in 17 seasons. He then coached thirteen seasons at Temple. He received a master's degree in counseling from Villanova, and currently resides in Villanova, Pa.

Education 
Dunphy attended St. Dorothy's grade school in Drexel Hill, Pennsylvania, and then went on to attend Malvern Preparatory School in Malvern, Pennsylvania. He is a 1970 La Salle graduate with a degree in marketing. While at La Salle, he played under head coach Tom Gola. As a junior, he helped the Explorers to a 23–1 record.  He served as a co-captain his senior year when he averaged 18.6 ppg and led the team in assists, while also being named the MVP of the annual Quaker City Basketball Tournament.  In 1979, he earned a master's degree in counseling and human relations from Villanova University. In addition, he completed his coursework toward his doctorate in counseling and student development at American University.

Personal 
Dunphy and his wife, Ree, reside in Villanova, Pennsylvania with their son, J.P. Dunphy.

Head coaching record

Coaching tree
Assistant coaches under Dunphy who became NCAA or NBA head coaches
 Matt Langel - Colgate (2011-present)
 Aaron McKie - Temple (2019-present)
 Dwayne Killings - Albany (2021-present)

References

External links
 Temple profile

1948 births
Living people
American Eagles men's basketball coaches
American men's basketball coaches
American men's basketball players
Army Black Knights men's basketball coaches
Basketball coaches from Pennsylvania
Basketball players from Pennsylvania
College men's basketball head coaches in the United States
High school basketball coaches in the United States
La Salle Explorers men's basketball coaches
La Salle Explorers men's basketball players
Malvern Preparatory School alumni
Penn Quakers men's basketball coaches
Sportspeople from Delaware County, Pennsylvania
People from Drexel Hill, Pennsylvania
Temple Owls athletic directors
Temple Owls men's basketball coaches